Bernard Gaffney (born 1986) is an Irish former hurler who played at club level with Newmarket-on-Fergus and at inter-county level with the Clare senior hurling team. He usually lined out as a forward.

Career

Gaffney first came to prominence as a hurler at juvenile and underage levels with the Newmarket-on-Fergus club before eventually progressing onto the senior team. He simultaneously represented the St. Flannan's College team and won an All-Ireland Colleges Championship title in 2005, having earlier won consecutive Harty Cup titles. Gaffney first appeared on the inter-county scene during a two-year spell with the Clare minor hurling team. He progressed onto the under-21 team before lining out with the Clare senior hurling team during the 2007 season. Gaffney also won a Fitzgibbon Cup medal with the Limerick Institute of Technology that year.

Career statistics

Honours

St. Flannan's College
Dr. Croke Cup: 2005
Dr. Harty Cup: 2004, 2005

Limerick Institute of Technology
Fitzgibbon Cup: 2007

References

1986 births
Living people
Newmarket-on-Fergus hurlers
Clare inter-county hurlers